Gracemont is a town in Caddo County, Oklahoma, United States. The population was 318 at the 2010 census. The town name is a portmanteau of Grace and Montgomery, the names of two friends of the first postmaster, Alice L. Bailey.

Geography
Gracemont is located east of the center of Caddo County at  (35.187872, -98.258633), in the valley of Sugar Creek, a tributary of the Washita River and part of the Red River watershed.

U.S. Route 281 passes through the town, leading south  to Anadarko, the county seat, and north  to Binger.

Demographics

As of the census of 2000, there were 336 people, 143 households, and 90 families residing in the town. There were 169 housing units at an average density of 1,106.2 per square mile (435.0/km2). The racial makeup of the town was 80.65% White, 12.50% Native American, 4.46% from other races, and 2.38% from two or more races. Hispanic or Latino of any race were 9.52% of the population.

There were 143 households, out of which 30.1% had children under the age of 18 living with them, 49.7% were married couples living together, 11.9% had a female householder with no husband present, and 36.4% were non-families. 35.0% of all households were made up of individuals, and 14.7% had someone living alone who was 65 years of age or older. The average household size was 2.35 and the average family size was 3.05.

In the town, the population was spread out, with 26.8% under the age of 18, 10.1% from 18 to 24, 25.0% from 25 to 44, 20.2% from 45 to 64, and 17.9% who were 65 years of age or older. The median age was 34 years. For every 100 females, there were 98.8 males. For every 100 females age 18 and over, there were 85.0 males.

The median income for a household in the town was $21,875, and the median income for a family was $34,167. Males had a median income of $24,792 versus $18,000 for females. The per capita income for the town was $13,026. About 14.9% of families and 19.5% of the population were below the poverty line, including 33.3% of those under age 18 and 8.7% of those age 65 or over.

Notable people
 T. C. Cannon, Native American artist
 Sunset Carson, B-western star of the 1940s
 Joe Edelen, former Major League Baseball relief pitcher, 1973 Major League Baseball Draft
 Doris McLemore, last fluent speaker of the Wichita language
 Kaycee Nicole Swenson, fictitious persona, well-known case of Münchausen by Internet from 1999 to 2001
 Harry Teague, former U.S. Representative for

References

External links
 Gracemont Public School
 Encyclopedia of Oklahoma History and Culture - Gracemont

Towns in Caddo County, Oklahoma
Towns in Oklahoma